The Love Songs may refer to:

 The Love Songs (Andy Williams album), 1997
 The Love Songs (Chris de Burgh album), 1997
 The Love Songs (Clint Black album), 2007
 The Love Songs (Peter Hammill album), 1984
 The Love Songs, a compilation album by Dionne Warwick, 1989
 The Love Songs, a compilation album by Westlife, 2014

See also
 Love Song (disambiguation)
 Love Songs (disambiguation)